The 1991 Bangladeshi presidential election was held on October 8, 1991. This was the first indirect election after the restoration of the parliamentary system. Abdur Rahman Biswas was nominated by the ruling party. He won the election unopposed as there were no other candidates to run for the election. Abdur Rahman Biswas took the oath of the President's Office and assumed the office on October 10, 1991.

References

Presidential
Bangladesh
Presidential elections in Bangladesh
October 1991 events in Bangladesh